Olsokflya is a coastal plain in Sørkapp Land at Spitsbergen, Svalbard. It is located at southwestern coast of Spitsbergen, between the moraine of Olsokbreen to the southeast and Bjørnbeinflya to the northwest.

References

Plains of Spitsbergen